This is a list of mayors of Alanya, Turkey.  Since becoming a "Belediye" (municipality) in 1872, Alanya has had eighteen mayors.  Briefly following the 1960 Turkish coup d'état the city had an appointed mayor.

Ahmet Asim Bey (1901 - 1904)
Hacı Hafız Kadri (1904 - 1905)
Ahmet Talat (1905 - 1927)
Hüsnü Şifa (1927 - 1930)
Hüseyin Hacikadiroğlu (1930 - 1936)
Hüseyin Okan (1936 - 1942)
Şükrü Ulusoy (1942 - 1950)
Mithat Görgün (1950 - 1959)
Yahya Barcin (1959 - 1960)
İzzet Azakoğlu (1963 - 1973)
Eşref Kahvecioğlu (1973 - 1980)
Şevket Tokuş (1980 - 1982)
Sıtkı Ulu (1982 - 1984)
Müstakbel Dim (1984 - 1989)
Cengiz Aydoğan (1989 - 1999)
Mustafa Bekar (1999 - 1999)
Hasan Sipahioğlu (1999 - 2014)
Adem Murat Yücel (2014–present)

References
Belediye Tarihi

Alanya
People from Alanya